Devin Haney vs. George Kambosos Jr II, billed as Repeat or Revenge, was a lightweight professional boxing match contested between the undisputed WBA (Super), WBC, IBF, WBO, and The Ring lightweight champion, Devin Haney and former unified champion George Kambosos Jr. The bout took place on 15 October 2022, at Rod Laver Arena in Melbourne, Australia.

Background 
On 27 March, Kambosos and Haney struck a deal to fight after Lomachenko declined to fight Kambosos, opting to stay and fight for his country after Russia invaded Lomachenko's country of Ukraine. This deal included Haney signing a two-fight deal with Top Rank and Lou DiBella to fight exclusively on ESPN platforms. The deal included a rematch clause in the event that Haney won, with the rematch also taking place in Australia.  Haney defeated Kambosos via unanimous decision on June 5 and Kambosos activated the rematch clause to take place on 16 October 2022, at Rod Laver Arena also in Melbourne, Australia.

In this fight Haney retained his undisputed lightweight world titles by beating Khambosos to a unanimous decision with the judges scoring it 119-109, 118-110 and 118-110 all in favor of Haney.

Fight card

See also

Boxing in Australia

References

Boxing matches
2022 in boxing
October 2022 sports events in Australia
Sports competitions in Melbourne
Boxing in Australia